Hemitheca is a genus of cnidarians belonging to the family Haleciidae.

Species:
 Hemitheca intermedia Hilgendorf, 1898

References

Haleciidae
Hydrozoan genera
Taxa named by Franz Martin Hilgendorf